This article contains a list of flags of international organizations.

Global

Transcontinental

Africa

Americas

Asia

Europe

Oceania

Flags
Vexillology
International organizations